David Robertson, 1st Baron Marjoribanks (2 April 1797 – 19 June 1873), was a Scottish stockbroker and politician.

Background
Born David Marjoribanks, he was the fourth son of Sir John Marjoribanks, 1st Baronet, MP and Lord Provost of Edinburgh. He was descended from Joseph Marjoribanks, a wine and fish merchant in Edinburgh who died in 1635 and is thought to have been the grandson of Thomas Marjoribanks of Ratho, head of the lowland clan Marjoribanks. In 1834 Marjoribanks married Marianne-Sarah, eldest daughter of Sir Thomas Haggeston of the Haggeston baronets and co-heir of her mother, Margaret (d. 1823), herself the heiress of William Robertson of Ladykirk. After the marriage Marjoribanks changed his name to Robertson in order to keep his wife's money and property.

Career
Robertson worked for a stockbroking firm specialising in Mexican bonds.  He eventually served as Member of Parliament for Berwickshire as a member of the Liberal party from 1859 to 1873, the former parliamentary constituency of his brother Charles Marjoribanks. He was also Lord Lieutenant of Berwickshire between 1860 and 1873. The latter year he was elevated to the peerage as Baron Marjoribanks, of Ladykirk in the County of Berwick, choosing the original family surname for the title.

Family
Lord Marjoribanks died after being knocked down by a horse-drawn bus outside his club in Newcastle in June 1873, aged 76, only a few days after his elevation to the peerage. His sons had predeceased him and his title consequently became extinct. He is buried at Ladykirk and his family mausoleum is nearby at Coldstream. In 2012, Ladykirk still remained in the possession of a descendant in the female line.

References

External links

1797 births
1873 deaths
Road incident deaths in England
Barons in the Peerage of the United Kingdom
Lord-Lieutenants of Berwickshire
Members of the Parliament of the United Kingdom for Scottish constituencies
UK MPs 1859–1865
UK MPs 1865–1868
UK MPs 1868–1874
UK MPs who were granted peerages
Younger sons of baronets
Scottish stockbrokers
Peers of the United Kingdom created by Queen Victoria
19th-century British businesspeople